Kaşüstü is a village in the Beşiri District of Batman Province in Turkey. The village is populated by Kurds of the Derhawî tribe and had a population of 38 in 2021.

The hamlets of Danacı and Ulular are attached to the village.

References 

Villages in Beşiri District
Kurdish settlements in Batman Province